Shari Gabrielson Goodmann (December 2, 1944-May 26, 2015), who published under the name Shari Benstock, was chairperson of the English department and associate dean for faculty affairs at the University of Miami and a feminist literary scholar. She was an expert on literary modernism, and a biographer of Edith Wharton.

Life

Early life and education
Shari Gabrielson was born in San Diego on December 2, 1944, the daughter of Dana and Myrl (Barth) Gabrielson. She grew up in Iowa and was educated at Luther College, Drake University, and Kent State University.

Career
She edited Tulsa Studies in Women's Literature from 1983 until 1986. With Celeste Schenck, she established "Reading Women Writing" at Cornell University Press, one of the first book series dedicated to women's writing and feminist scholarship. In 1986, she published Women of the Left Bank, which explores the lives and works of some two dozen American, English and French women among the Paris expatriate literari, including Gertrude Stein, Alice B. Toklas, Sylvia Beach, Adrienne Monnier, Djuna Barnes, Natalie Barney, H. D., and Bryher.

University of Miami
In 1986, she left the University of Tulsa for the University of Miami, where she was a faculty member until 2006. She founded the University of Miami's program in Women's and Gender Studies and served as chairperson of the University of Miami's English department and associate dean for faculty affairs for the university's College of Arts and Sciences.

Personal life
Benstock married Mel Shyvers, with whom she had a son, Eric. She subsequently married Bernard Benstock, a James Joyce scholar, who died in 1994. In 2004, she married Thomas Goodmann, associate professor of English at the University of Miami, who cared for her in the last decade of her life during which she suffered from early onset dementia.

Works
 Who's He When He's at Home: A James Joyce Directory, 1980 (with Bernard Benstock)
 Women of the Left Bank: Paris, 1900-1940, 1986
 The Private Self: Theory and Practice of Women's Autobiographical Writings, 1988 (editor)
 Coping With Joyce: Essays from the Copenhagen Symposium] 1989 (editor with Morris Beja)
 “No Gifts from Chance”: A Biography of Edith Wharton, 1994 (editor)
 On Fashion, 1994 (editor with Suzanne Ferriss)
 'The House of Mirth by Edith Wharton. 1994 (editor)
 Footnotes: On Shoes, 2001 (editor with Suzanne Ferriss)
 A Handbook of Literary Feminism'', 2002 (with Suzanne Ferriss)

References

1944 births
2015 deaths
American biographers
American literary critics
Women literary critics
American feminist writers
University of Tulsa faculty
University of Miami faculty
American women critics